Katong was a  cargo ship which was built in 1944 by Lübecker Maschinenbau-Gesellschaft, Lübeck, Germany as Peter Rickmers for Rickmers Line. She was seized as a war prize at Stettin in May 1945 and passed to the Ministry of War Transport (MoWT) as an Empire ship and renamed Empire Colne. In 1947 she was sold to Singapore and renamed Katong. She was sold in 1971 and renamed Greengate. In 1972 she was sold and renamed Ever Glory. She was scrapped in 1974.

Description
The ship was built by Lübecker Maschinenbau-Gesellschaft and was launched in 1944.

She had a GRT of 1,923 and a NRT of 935.

The ship was propelled by a steam engine.

History
Peter Rickmers was built for Rickmers Line. In 1945, she was seized in an incomplete state at Stettin. Declared a war prize, she was completed at Lübeck as Empire Colne. Her port of registry was London. The United Kingdom Official Number 180845 and Code Letters GDPX were allocated. She was operated under the management of Indo-China Steam Navigation Co Ltd.

In 1947, she was sold to the Straits Steamship Co Ltd, Singapore and was renamed Katong. She served until 1971 when she was sold to Greenland Ocean Lines Ltd, Singapore and was renamed Greengate. In 1972, she was sold to Lam Kok Shipping Co, Singapore and was renamed Ever Glory. She was scrapped in June 1974 in China.

References

External links
Photo of Empire Colne
Photo of Ever Glory

1944 ships
Ships built in Lübeck
Steamships of Germany
World War II merchant ships of Germany
Ministry of War Transport ships
Empire ships
Steamships of the United Kingdom
Merchant ships of the United Kingdom
Steamships of Singapore
Merchant ships of Singapore